Cecidomyia is a genus of gall midges in the tribe Cecidomyiini.

References

External links 
 
 

Cecidomyiidae genera
Cecidomyiinae